Etta James Sings Funk is the eighth studio album by American Blues artist, Etta James. The album was released on Cadet Records in 1970.

Release 
The album was James's fourth release on the Cadet record label and was produced in Chicago, Illinois. The album includes a mix of Soul, Rhythm and Blues, and regular Blues. The album spawned two singles: "Tighten Up Your Own Thing" and "Sound of Love." While both singles were released to radio, neither of them charted the Rhythm and Blues or the Billboard Hot 100 charts in 1970. The album was released as 12-inch LP record and has not been reissued on compact disc in its entirety although five tracks were included as additional cuts on the reissue by Kent of Etta James' Losers Weepers' album in 2011.

Critical reception 
Reviewing in Christgau's Record Guide: Rock Albums of the Seventies (1981), Robert Christgau wrote: "As you can read on the back [sleeve], funk isn't a style or something like that—it's just, well, Etta. Etta with chorus, Etta with full brass, Etta with strings even. Etta singing a Gershwin song, Etta singing a Bee Gees song, Etta singing three Acuff-Rose songs, Etta singing four Pearl Woods songs. (Pearl Woods?) Highlights: the Acuff-Rose songs."

Track listing

References

1970 albums
Etta James albums
Albums produced by Ralph Bass
Cadet Records albums